is an arcade racing game that was released by Namco in 1995. It runs on Namco System 22 hardware, and could be played by two people per cabinet for up to eight players total when up to four of them were linked together. It is the third arcade title in the Ridge Racer series and the follow-up to Ridge Racer and Ridge Racer 2.

Compared to Ridge Racer 2, Rave Racer adds two new tracks as well as the ability to play the original two, various handling changes, force feedback steering, and improved car and racetrack graphics. Like Ridge Racer 2, Rave Racer featured a new soundtrack. The new tracks contain various side roads, but some of them take more time than others to complete a full lap of the track.

Gameplay

Rave Racer is a racing video game. Players control a racecar in an attempt to complete a series of races in first place while avoiding opponents. Each race is made of four laps that must be completed under a time limit; finishing a lap adds a few extra seconds to the timer.

Development and release
A Microsoft Windows version was originally under development for NEC's PowerVR graphics processor, and was demonstrated in early 1996. However the game was cancelled, thus no games in the Ridge Racer series were released for PCs until Unbounded in 2012. A PlayStation version was announced later in 1996, but it too was cancelled.

Reception

In Japan, Game Machine listed Rave Racer as the most popular dedicated arcade game of September 1995. It went on to be the highest-grossing dedicated arcade game of 1996 in Japan.

A critic for Next Generation remarked that while the game makes few changes from its predecessors, those changes are important enough to make it a dramatic improvement. He found the more accurate and responsive control particularly pleasing, saying it allows players to pull off more impressive maneuvers and race without having to compensate for the controls. He also praised the fast-paced music and graphical touches. Concluding that "despite only four courses, one of which is a rehash, this racer kicks", he gave it four out of five stars.

In 1996, Next Generation listed the game at number 94 in their "Top 100 Games of All Time", citing a force-feedback steering wheel, loud speakers, a huge monitor, and a link to up to seven other units.

Notes

References

External links

1995 video games
Arcade video games
Arcade-only video games
Cancelled PlayStation (console) games
Cancelled Windows games
Namco arcade games
Namco System 22 games
Racing video games
Ridge Racer
Video games developed in Japan
Video games scored by Shinji Hosoe